David Faulkner is a former two-time U.S. national champion in judo. He is also a two-time silver and bronze medalist in the national championships in Judo.  He was an alternate member of the US team for the 1992 Summer Olympics.

References

American male judoka